Scotland sent a team of 207 athletes and 85 officials to the 2002 Commonwealth Games in Manchester, England.

In the Manchester Games Scotland won 6 Gold, 8 Silver and 16 Bronze medals.

Gold
Cycling:
 Chris Hoy, Men's 1000m Time Trial

Gymnastics:
 Steve Frew, Men's Rings (tied first with Herodotos Giorgallas of Cyprus)

Judo:
 Graeme Randall, Men's 81kg

Lawn Bowls:
 Alex Marshall & George Sneddon, Men's Doubles
 David Heddle, Ivan Prior & John Robertson, Men's Triples EAD

Swimming:
 Alison Sheppard, Women's 50m Freestyle

Silver

Athletics:
 Lee McConnell, Women's 400m

Judo:
 Jenni Brien, Women's 57kg
 Sarah Clark, Women's 63kg
 David Taylor Somerville, Men's 66kg

Shooting:
 Michael Thomson, Men's Skeet
 Susan Jackson & Sheena Sharp, Women's 50m Rifle Prone Pairs

Swimming:
 Graeme Smith, Men's 1500m Freestyle
 Gregor Tait, Men's 200m Backstroke

Bronze

Athletics:
 Jamie Stephen Quarry, Men's Decathlon

Badminton:
 Bruce Flockhart, Alastair Gatt, Russell Hogg, Susan Hughes, Kirsteen McEwan, Elinor Middlemiss, Craig Robertson, Graham Simpson, Graeme Smith, Fiona Sneddon, Sandra Watt & Yuan Wemyss, Team

Boxing:
 Craig McEwan, Light Middleweight 71kg
 Andrew Young, Heavyweight 91kg

Cycling:
 Ross Edgar, Chris Hoy, Marco Librizzi & Craig MacLean, Team Sprint

Gymnastics:
 Barry Collie, Men's Vault

Judo:
 Amanda Costello, Women's 70kg
 Karen Cusack, Women's 52kg
 Stephanie Hart, Women's 78kg+
 Lee McGroty, Men's 73kg
 Fiona Robertson, Women's 48kg
 Steven Vidler, Men's 90kg

Shooting:
 Edith Barnes, Women's Skeet

Swimming:
 Alison Sheppard, Women's 50m Butterfly
 Graeme Smith, Men's 400m Freestyle

Weightlifting:
 Thomas Yule, Men's 94kg Snatch

Team Scotland

Boxing
 Kevin Anderson
 Mark Hastie
 Craig Murray
 Steven McGuire
 Colin McNeil
 Ian Millarvie
 Lee Ramsay
 Andrew Young

Cycling
 Caroline Alexander
 Sally Ashbridge
 Jo Cavill
 Caroline Cook
 Katrina Hair
 Russell Anderson
 Richard Chapman
 Ross Edgar
 Chris Hoy
 Alistair Kay
 Marco Librizzi
 Craig MacLean
 James McCallum
 Jason MacIntyre
 David Millar
 Ross Muir
 Michael Pooley
 Alexander Ross
 Duncan Urquhart

Hockey

Women's team competition
 Jane Burley
 Linda Clement
 Susan Gilmour
 Louise Gordon
 Alison Grant
 Kathryn Gray
 Samantha Judge
 Claire Lampard
 Audrey Longmuir
 Susan MacDonald
 Debbie McLeod
 Tracey Robb
 Emma Rochlin
 Rhona Simpson
 Valery Thomson
 Helen Walker

Judo

Men's competition 

 Thomas Allan
 John Buchanan
 Gary Edwards
 Lee McGrorty
 Graeme Randall
 David Somerville
 Steven Vidler

Women's competition
 Jennifer Brien
 Sarah Clarke
 Amanda Costello
 Karen Cusack
 Stephanie Hart
 Fiona Robertson
 Lindsay Sorrell

Squash
 Pamela Nimmo
 Senga MacFie
 Wendy Maitland
 Neil Frankland
 Martin Heath

Table tennis
 Claire Bentley
 Niall Cameron
 Stewart Crawford
 Gavin Rumgay
 Euan Walker

Triathlon

Men's competition
 Richard Allan
 Kevin Clark
 Andrew Fargus

Women's competition
 Bella Comerford
 Stephanie Forrester
 Catriona Morrison

Weightlifting
 Kirstie Law
 Stuart Yule
 Thomas Yule

Wrestling
 Joseph Bianco
 Kenny Devoy
 Graeme English
 Jamie English
 Steven McKeown
 Douglas Thomson

See also
 Commonwealth Games Council for Scotland

References
 sportscotland

External links
 Scotland Commonwealth Games Team: Manchester, England 2002

2002
Nations at the 2002 Commonwealth Games
Commonwealth Games